"Whatever Will Be" is the second song released by Australian actress Tammin from her first album, Whatever Will Be (2005). Issued as a CD single on 28 March 2005, "Whatever Will Be" reached number 13 on the Australian Singles Chart.

Background
The song is about how you should not take life too seriously and just to take every day as it comes. It is about how you should not regret the past and look towards the future.

Chart performance
On 4 April 2005, "Whatever Will Be" made its official debut on the Australian ARIA Singles Chart at number 13. On 11 April, the song dropped 11 spots, to number 24. It spent a further eight weeks rising and falling within the top 30 until leaving the top 30 on 19 June and the top 50 on 17 July.

Track listing
Australian CD single
 "Whatever Will Be"
 "Whatever Will Be" (Metro mix)
 "Whatever Will Be" (Location mix)
 "Around the World"
 "Pointless Relationship" (video)

Credits and personnel
Credits are lifted from the Whatever Will Be liner notes.

Studios
 Recorded and mixed at The Location (Stockholm, Sweden)
 Mastered at Studio 301 (Sydney, Australia)

Personnel

 Jake Schulze – writing, all other instruments, programming, production, recording, mixing, arrangement
 Savan Kotecha – writing, Hyperboard extension engineering
 Carl Falk – writing, all other instruments, programming, production, recording, arrangement
 Anna Nordell – background vocals
 Jurl – background vocals
 Linnea – background vocals
 Sebastian Thott – acoustic guitars
 Karl Engström – electric guitars
 Tomas Lindberg – bass
 Kalle Engström – all other instruments, programming, production, recording, mixing, arrangement
 Ray Hedges – remixing
 Don Bartley – mastering

Charts

Weekly charts

Year-end charts

References

Tammin Sursok songs
2005 singles
2005 songs
Songs written by Carl Falk
Songs written by Jake Schulze
Songs written by Savan Kotecha
Sony BMG singles